LP 658-2 is a degenerate (white dwarf) star in the constellation of Orion, the single known object in its system. It has an apparent visual magnitude of approximately 14.488.

Distance

According to a 2009 paper, it is the eighth closest known white dwarf to the Sun (after Sirius B, Procyon B, van Maanen's star, Gliese 440, 40 Eridani B, Stein 2051 B and GJ 1221). Its trigonometric parallax from the CTIOPI (Cerro Tololo Inter-American Observatory (CTIO) Parallax Investigation) 0.9 m telescope program, published in 2009, is 0.15613 ± 0.00084 arcsec, corresponding to a distance 6.40 ± 0.03 pc, or 20.89 ± 0.11 ly. Also, previous less precise parallax measurements of LP 658-2 present in YPC (Yale Parallax Catalog) and among results of CTIOPI 1.5 m telescope program:

LP 658-2 parallax measurements

Physical parameters

Color

Despite it being classified as a "white" dwarf, it appears yellowish white rather than white, due to temperature, cooler than the Sun's and comparable with that of a K-type main sequence star.

Notes

References

Orion (constellation)
White dwarfs
0223.2